is a railway station on the Iida Line in the village of Tenryū, Shimoina, Nagano Prefecture, Japan, operated by Central Japan Railway Company (JR Central).

Lines
Ina-Kozawa Station is served by the Iida Line and is 90.1 kilometers from the starting point of the line at Toyohashi Station.

Station layout
The station consists of a two opposed ground-level side platforms connected by a level crossing. The station is unattended. There is no station building, but only a waiting room on the platform.

Platforms

Adjacent stations

History
Ina-Kozawa Station opened on 30 December 1936. With the privatization of Japanese National Railways (JNR) on 1 April 1987, the station came under the control of JR Central.

Passenger statistics
In fiscal 2016, the station was used by an average of 3 passengers daily (boarding passengers only).

Surrounding area
 Tenryu River

See also
 List of railway stations in Japan

References

External links

 Ina-Kozawa Station information 

Railway stations in Nagano Prefecture
Railway stations in Japan opened in 1936
Stations of Central Japan Railway Company
Iida Line
Tenryū, Nagano